Edward Sonnenblick (born 27 June 1970) is an American actor known for his works in Indian cinema and television. He has starred in works such as Firangi (2017), Veere Di Wedding (2018), Manikarnika: The Queen of Jhansi (2019), Kesari (2019), and RRR (2022). He appeared in television series such as Jhansi Ki Rani, and The Kapil Sharma Show.

Early life and career
Edward Sonnenblick was born in Southern California and grew up in San Francisco, United States. He graduated from Humboldt State University with a BS in Botany. Later, he worked as a natural foods chef in Northern California for 15 years.

Edward learnt Hindi and moved to Mumbai to seek his fortune as an actor. Edward was inspired by the 2001 Hindi film Lagaan. He visited India in 2005 for a two-week course at the Vipassana International Academy in Igatpuri, Nashik. He went on to play double role of evil British twin brothers in Jhansi Ki Rani. Edward was the host of the serial Indipedia on Epic channel in 2017. He has worked in films like  Manikarnika: The Queen of Jhansi, Veere Di Wedding, and RRR.

Personal life
Edward is married to Sonal Mehta, a freelance creative director in June 2009, whom he met a year back. The couple have a son.

Filmography

Television

References

External links
 
 
 
 Edward Sonnenblick at Box Office India

1970 births
Living people